Ameen is a surname. Notable people with the surname include:
Aml Ameen (born 1985), English actor
A. R. Ameen (born 2003), Indian singer
Hassan Ameen (born 1985), Emirati footballer
Jamal Ameen, Kuwaiti fencer
Kanwal Ameen, Pakistani information theorist
Mohammed Ameen (born 1980), Saudi Arabian footballer
Muhammad Afsarul Ameen, Bangladesh politician
Nihar Ameen, Indian swimming coach
Robby Ameen (born 1960), American drummer and composer
Sidra Ameen (born 1992), Pakistani cricketer

See also
 Amen (disambiguation)
 Amin (disambiguation)
 Amine (disambiguation)